Life expectancy at birth in 2013 was 74 for men and 79 for women.

Obesity
In 2014 Sultan Qaboos University published research showing  that 30% of the Omani population was overweight and 20% was obese.

Smoking
A ban on smoking in public places was introduced in 2010.  Restaurants, malls and other public places were required to allot more than 50% of their space as non-smoking zones.  70% of residents suffer from some kind of curable disease related to smoking.

See also

 Healthcare in Oman
 List of hospitals in Oman

References